The 2021 season was Petaling Jaya City FC's 18th season since its establishment in 2004. The club participated in the Malaysia Super League for the 3rd time since 2019.

Players

Transfers

Transfers in

Transfers to

Squad statistics

Appearances and goals

Competitions

Malaysia Super League

League table

Matches

Malaysia Cup

Group stage

The draw for the group stage was held on 15 September 2021.

References

Petaling Jaya City FC
Petaling Jaya City FC seasons
2021 in Malaysian football
Petaling Jaya City